John Gerhard Sutthoff (June 29, 1873 – August 3, 1942) was a pitcher in Major League Baseball. He played all or parts of six seasons in the major leagues between 1898 and 1905, for four teams.

References

External links

Major League Baseball pitchers
Washington Senators (1891–1899) players
St. Louis Perfectos players
Cincinnati Reds players
Philadelphia Phillies players
Toronto Canucks players
St. Thomas Saints players
Toronto Maple Leafs (International League) players
Syracuse Stars (minor league baseball) players
Binghamton Crickets (1880s) players
Schenectady Electricians players
Indianapolis Hoosiers (minor league) players
Indianapolis Indians players
Columbus Senators players
Toledo Mud Hens players
Louisville Colonels (minor league) players
Baseball players from Cincinnati
1873 births
1942 deaths
19th-century baseball players